Philip Polly Okin Ojara (born 26 May 1971) is a Ugandan social worker and politician. He is the elected member of parliament for Chua West County, Kitgum District, and is an Independent politician who closely associates with FDC, the main opposition party in Uganda. He is a member the Caucus of Independent MPs and the Opposition Caucus and also serves as the vice chairperson of the Committee on Local Government Accounts and as a member of the Appointments Committee and the Committee on Agriculture in the 10th Parliament of Uganda.

Ojara is the chairperson of the select committee to investigate alleged mismanagement in Uganda Telecom (UTL) and a founder member of the Parliament Public Finance Management Forum. Also he is a member of both the Parliamentary Forum on Climate Change and the Uganda Parliamentary Prayer Breakfast Fellowship.

Early life and education
Ojara was born in Kitgum, Acholi sub-region, on 26 May 1971 in an Anglican family of the Acholi. He had his primary education in his home town of Kitgum and attained his PLE certification in 1987.

He then attended Lango College for his O-Level education and Sir Samuel Baker Secondary School for his A-Level education, attaining a UCE certification in 1991 and a UACE certification in 1994.

Ojara further advanced to Makerere University, where he attained a bachelor's degree in social work and social administration in 1997. He then went to Trinity College, Dublin, graduating in 2006 with a Master of Philosophy in international peace studies.

Career and politics
Ojara started his professional career in 1998 after attaining his bachelor's degree and worked as a program officer for the International Rescue Committee (IRC) up until 1999 when he secured employment as a project officer for Save the Children. In 2002, he left the children's rights organization for Acholi Religious Leaders Peace Initiative (ARLPI), an interfaith peace building and conflict transformation organization, where he worked as a program coordinator for three years. In 2005, he joined UNDP Uganda for a one year spell as a District Disaster Preparedness Coordinator in the Office of the Prime Minister (OPM).

In 2007, Ojara secured employment at the Cooperative for Assistance and Relief Everywhere (CARE International, Uganda) where he worked as a team leader up until 2009 when he was recruited as a senior technical advisor by UNDP South Sudan. In 2013, he worked as a distributor for Total Uganda before serving as the Prime Minister Acholi Kingdom in 2014 up until 2015 when he resigned to join active politics.

In 2015, Ojara joined elective politics as an independent politician and strategized for the 2016 polls, a move that heavily contributed to his victory in the 2016 general elections thereby becoming a member of the 10th Parliament for the Pearl of Africa representing Chua West County in Kitgum District. In the 10th Parliament, Ojara serves as the vice chairperson of the Committee on Local Government Accounts and as a member of the Appointments Committee and the Committee on Agriculture. In December 2016, Ojara was appointed by the speaker of parliament as the chairperson of the select committee to investigate alleged mismanagement in Uganda Telecom.

In the eleventh parliament he serves on the Committee on Foreign Affairs.

Private details
Ojara is a married man with a number of children. He is passionate about civil rights and social action, economic empowerment, education, health, human-rights, politics and poverty alleviation issues.

See also 
Kitgum District
Parliament of Uganda

References

External links 
 Website of the Parliament of Uganda
 Link to Uganda Parliamentary Prayer Breakfast Fellowship

Living people
1971 births
Members of the Parliament of Uganda
People from Northern Region, Uganda
Active politicians
Makerere University alumni
Alumni of Trinity College Dublin
Acholi people
Forum for Democratic Change politicians
21st-century Ugandan politicians